Henry Thomas Oxnard (June 23, 1860 – June 8, 1922) was a French-born, American entrepreneur and namesake of Oxnard, California and its Henry T. Oxnard Historic District. Oxnard was president of both the American Beet Sugar Company (which later changed its name to American Crystal Sugar Company) and the American Beet Sugar Association, which represents all the beet sugar factories in the United States. He and his brothers controlled five sugar factories in the United States.

Background
Henry Thomas Oxnard was born to Adeline (née Brown) and Thomas A. Oxnard. He had three brothers, Robert, Benjamin A. and James G. In 1860, Oxnard's French-born father sold his sugar cane plantations and refinery in Louisiana, and by doing so was able to escape the business risks of the American Civil War by returning to his native France where Henry was born in Marseilles the year before the Civil War started. The family returned to the United States where Henry Oxnard would grow up in Massachusetts and attend Harvard College.

In 1889, Oxnard and his associates established a sugar refinery in Grand Island, Nebraska. In 1891, two more plants were built in Chino, California and Norfolk, Nebraska. In 1899, Oxnard opened a factory in Ventura County, California. The area around the plant later would become the town of Oxnard.

In 1900, Henry Oxnard married Marie Pichon with whom he had two daughters, Adeline (1901) who was named for her paternal grandmother, and Nadine (1903).

Thoroughbred horse racing
Henry Oxnard raced Thoroughbred horses under the nom de course Albemarle Stable. In 1902 he hired future Hall of Fame inductee R. Wyndham Walden to train his stable of horses.

In 1903, Henry Oxnard purchased the 517 acre Blue Ridge Farm in Upperville, Virginia where he established a Thoroughbred breeding operation. In 2006, the farm was designated for its historical significance by the Virginia Landmarks Register and the National Register of Historic Places.

Many involved in the horse racing industry were greatly harmed by the 1908 Hart–Agnew Law which led to the closing of all racing in New York state in 1911 and 1912.  A February 21, 1913 ruling by the New York Supreme Court, Appellate Division saw horse racing return in 1913. Prior to the restart, in April Henry Oxnard and other wealthy industry leaders created the "Owners Fund" to cover losses for 1913 and 1914 incurred by those less fortunate who might need financial assistance while attempting to get back on their feet again.

Death

Henry Oxnard died on June 8, 1922, in New York City. He is interred at Mount Olivet Cemetery in Washington, D.C.

Notes

References

External links

1860 births
1922 deaths
19th-century American businesspeople
20th-century American businesspeople
American racehorse owners and breeders
Businesspeople from Marseille
Businesspeople from Massachusetts
Businesspeople in the sugar industry
Harvard College alumni
Oxnard, California
Burials at Mount Olivet Cemetery (Washington, D.C.)